The Italy men's national pitch and putt team represents Italy in the pitch and putt international competitions. It is managed by the Federazione Italiana de Pitch and Putt (FIPP).

It was one of the founders of the European Pitch and Putt Association, the governing body that develops the pitch and putt in Europe and stages a biennial European Team Championship, where Italy reached the third place in 1999 and 2001. In 2006 participated in the creation of the Federation of International Pitch and Putt Associations (FIPPA), that stages a biennial World Cup Team Championship.

In 2009, vacated their membership of FIPPA and EPPA and joined another international association, IPPA.

National team

Players
National team in the World Cup 2008
Enrico Ciuffarella
Anglo Fusco
Vanni Rastrelli

National team in the European Championship 2007
Enrico Ciuffarella
Angelo Fusco
Luigi Jannuzzellu
Alessandro Menna
Paolo Peretti
Alberto Viotto

National team in the World Cup 2006
Fabrizio Frassoldati
Alessandro Menna
Giuseppe Sinisi

National team in the European Championship 2005
Antonio Trasforini
Giovanni Trasforini
Simona Sala
Alessandro Menna
Fabrizio Frassoldati
Savino Presciutti

National team in the World Cup 2004
Antonio Trasforini
Simona Sala
Alessandro Menna

Notes and references

See also
World Cup Team Championship
European Team Championship

External links
FIPP Federazione Italiana Pitch and Putt

National pitch and putt teams
Pitch and putt